Nowickia is a genus of large flies in the family Tachinidae.

Taxonomy
Nowickia Wachtl, 1894, treated by some authors as a subgenus of  Tachina Meigen, 1803, following most authors is now accepted as a valid genus and treated separately.

Species
Species within this genus include:
 Nowickia alpina (Zetterstedt, 1849) 
 Nowickia astra (Zimin, 1935) 
 Nowickia atripalpis (Robineau-Desvoidy, 1863)
 Nowickia brevipalpis Zhao & Zhou, 1993
 Nowickia deflexa Zimin, 1980
 Nowickia deludans (Villeneuve, 1936)
 Nowickia ferox (Panzer, 1809) 
 Nowickia funebris (Villeneuve, 1936) 
 Nowickia gussakovskii (Zimin, 1928) 
 Nowickia gussakovskyi Zimin, 1980
 Nowickia heifu (Chao & Shi, 1982)
 Nowickia hingstoniae  (Mesnil, 1966)
 Nowickia latilinea (Chao & Zhou, 1993)
 Nowickia markliniZetterstedt, 1838
 Nowickia memorabilis (Zimin, 1949) 
 Nowickia mongolica (Zimin, 1935)
 Nowickia nigrovillosa(Zimin, 1935)
 Nowickia pamirica (Enderlein, 1934) 
 Nowickia polita  (Zimin, 1935)
 Nowickia reducta Mesnil, 1970
 Nowickia rondanii (Giglio-Tos, 1890) 
 Tachina strobelii (Rondani, 1865)
 Nowickia umbripennis (Zimin, 1974)

References

Diptera of Europe
Tachininae
Tachinidae genera